Andrew Crawford Davidson (24 February 1878 – 1949) was a Scottish footballer who played at half-back for various clubs in the 1900s, spending most of his career with Middlesbrough.

Football career
Davidson was born in Auchinleck in East Ayrshire and started his professional football career with Ayr United before moving to England to join Middlesbrough in May 1900.

At Middlesbrough, he soon became a permanent fixture at left-half, making 32 league appearances in the 1900–01 season as Middlesbrough finished sixth in the Second Division table. The following season, he was ever-present as Middlesbrough finished as runners-up, thus gaining promotion to the First Division.

Davidson rarely missed a match over the next two years, but in 1904–05 he missed most of the season through injury, with Joe Cassidy dropping back to replace him. He was back to full fitness for the following season as Middlesbrough narrowly avoided relegation.

In the summer of 1906, he moved to fellow First Division side, Bury, having made over 200 appearances for Middlesbrough in the League and FA Cup.

Davidson spent two seasons with Bury, before moving on to join Grimsby Town in May 1908. At Grimsby, he gained a reputation as a quick centre-half and was appointed the team captain. In July 1909, he moved to Southampton of the Southern League, where he failed to reproduce the form he had shown at Blundell Park and, after only five appearances, he returned to Grimsby, where he played for the rest of the 1909–10 season before dropping down to non-league football.

Honours
Middlesbrough
Football League Second Division runners-up: 1901–02

References

1878 births
1949 deaths
Footballers from East Ayrshire
Scottish footballers
Association football defenders
Ayr United F.C. players
Middlesbrough F.C. players
Bury F.C. players
Grimsby Town F.C. players
Southampton F.C. players
Scottish Football League players
English Football League players
Southern Football League players